Platnickina mneon is a species of cobweb spider in the family Theridiidae. It is found in South America, has been introduced into Ghana, Seychelles, China, Japan, and Pacific Islands.

References

Theridiidae
Articles created by Qbugbot
Spiders described in 1906